Mammad Araz (14 October 1933 in Nursu, Nakhchivan – 1 December 2004 in Baku, Azerbaijan), born Mammad Ibrahimov, was an Azerbaijani poet. His pen name was Araz, the Azerbaijani spelling for the Aras river.

Early life
In 1954, he graduated degrees in Geography from Azerbaijan's Pedagogical Institute. Araz has also worked on the editorial offices of Maarif Publication House in Baku, Ulduz Magazine (1967–1970), Literature and Art newspaper (1970–1972) and Azerbaijan State Publication House (1972–1974). He has also worked long time as editor of "Nature of Azerbaijan" magazine since 1974.

Family 

 He is the father of publicist Irada Tuncay.
 The writer-journalist is the father-in-law of MP Agil Abbas.
 The poet is Rehile Elchin's uncle.

Poetry 

He is also the author of "The World is Yours, The World is Mine" (Dunya Sanin, Dunya Manim) poem, which was lyrics of very popular music hit in Azerbaijan in 90s. The first book of poems of him called "Love song" (in Azerbaijan-Sevgi nəğməsi) was published in 1959 by "Azerneshr".

Some of Araz's famous works include:
If There Were No War
The World is Yours, The World is Mine
The Sound Written on the Rocks
Father of Three Sons
Come on, Rise Up, Azerbaijan!(1992)

His works published in English by Betty Blair such as:

Recognition
Araz has been recognized with the following awards: Honored Culture Worker of Azerbaijan (1978), Laureate of Republican State Award  (1988) and "Istiglal" (Independence) Order.

References

1933 births
2004 deaths
Azerbaijani poets
People from the Nakhchivan Autonomous Republic
Recipients of the Istiglal Order
20th-century poets
Honored Art Workers of the Azerbaijan SSR